Adventist University of West Congo is a private Christian co-educational school owned and operated by the Seventh-day Adventist Church in the Democratic Republic of the Congo. The university is located in Kinshasa, Democratic Republic of the Congo.

It is a part of the Seventh-day Adventist education system, the world's second largest Christian school system.

History
The university was officially inaugurated in late January 2017. It was established to train ministerial students in the area and pursued accreditation through the Adventist Accrediting Association.

See also

 List of Seventh-day Adventist colleges and universities
 Seventh-day Adventist education
 Seventh-day Adventist Church
 Seventh-day Adventist theology
 History of the Seventh-day Adventist Church

References 

Universities and colleges affiliated with the Seventh-day Adventist Church
Universities in the Democratic Republic of the Congo